Ranczo ["Ranch"] is a Polish television comedy series, directed by Wojciech Adamczyk, that originally aired from March 25, 2006 to November 27, 2016 on TVP1. It follows the story of Lucy Wilska, a Polish-American who has inherited her grandmother's country home in the fictional small village of Wilkowyje.  She arrives in Wilkowyje with intent to sell the cottage but, after seeing the charm of the village, decides to stay.

Characters 
Lucy Wilska –  an American of Polish descent, who inherits her grandmother's manor house in a small village Wilkowyje in eastern Poland. She's optimistic, honest, kind and brave in willing to act to improve the world around her. She befriends Kusy, who lives in a cottage next to her house and the two soon start a relationship. In Season 4 they married and have a daughter, Dorotka. She works as an English teacher in early seasons. From Season 4 to 9 she serves as the mayor of the town. After leaving the office she temporarily returns to the United States and returns to Poland in the last episode.

Jakub "Kusy" Sokołowski – a former famous abstract painter, who went through a breakdown and fell into alcoholism after the death of his first wife. Early in the series, he lives in a cottage next to Lucy's manor and helps her in its renovation. He soon fells in love with Lucy but doesn't believe himself to be worthy of her and even rejects her when she confesses she's in love with him as well. For a short time he dates Violetka. He and Lucy become a couple in Season 3 and marry in Season 4. Under Lucy's influence, Kusy quits drinking and paints again, which no one in the town understands. He pursues an artist career in later seasons with help of an art agent Monika. He's smart, highly educated and brave - in one episode he organizes the whole town's defense against the mob. He's also emotional and chivalrous, more than once getting violent in defence of Lucy and her good name. His real name wasn't revealed until Season 4 and everyone in town refers to him as "Kusy". Lucy herself didn't find out his real name until the day of their wedding, and even after that she still always calls him "Kusy".

Piotr Kozioł – the parish priest of Wilkowyje's Roman Catholic Church and twin brother of Mayor Paweł Koziol. Unlike his brother, he is respected and has friendly relations with most people in the village. Most of the time he's kind, well-meaning, and cares for the public good, but to some extent also shares his brother's greedy and impetuous personality often getting in power and influence struggles with the Mayor. An example from the first season includes both the Priest and the Mayor fighting for control over the only local newspaper, each trying to censor it and use it as his own propaganda tool. The two brothers are adversaries, but occasionally work together to achieve a common goal. They make a few attempts to reconcile, which they finally do in the finale of Season 4, but they still have many disagreements afterwards. Priest Kozioł quickly gets in friendly relations with Lucy and often supports her in her initiatives, but sometimes finds himself at odds with her progressive ideas. In the Season 8 finale he becomes an auxiliary bishop of the Archdiocese of Lublin.

Paweł Kozioł – the mayor of Wilkowyje and, especially in early seasons, antagonist to his twin brother, priest Piotr Kozioł and to Lucy. He's corrupt, dishonest and incompetent in office and cares mostly about his personal interests, often resorting to blackmail, threats and power abuse to achieve his goals. He's also impetuous, often screaming at others and often even threatening people with a hatchet (he keeps one at his office especially for that purpose). In the first season he tries to make life difficult for Lucy in numerous ways in hope of making her leave the town, as he intended to buy her house for his daughter Klaudia (who is not at all interested in it). That includes sending hired drunks to scare Lucy off at night (whom she easily dispatches by shooting blanks at them), spreading supposedly compromising rumours about her, blocking Lucy's employment at the local school and bribing the construction crew into trying to convince Lucy that the house is haunted. All of that fails, however, and later the Mayor gives up. In Season 4 he is not reelected, while Lucy is elected as the new mayor of Wilkowyje. However, in Season 5 he revives his political career by winning a by-election for a place in the Senate and starting his own political party - Polish Party of Honesty - together with Arkadiusz Czerepach, his former secretary. He quickly becomes famous after being caught on TV completely drunk his first day in the Senate. Due to his own and Czerepach's manipulations and propaganda and his incompetence, his vulgarity is often mistaken for eccentricity and a sign of protest against the establishment (an homage by the show to the character of Nikodem Dyzma, a popular figure of Polish literature and TV - an uneducated simpleton who starts a successful political career by a series of misunderstandings). In last episode of the show, he is elected as the new President of Poland. Just before the elections, he is frightened by the office's responsibility and decides to take his new role seriously, rather than just another means to achieve his personal goals.

Michałowa – The rectory's housekeeper. She eavesdrops and selects the priest's guests. Her husband's name was Michał and she is called "Michałowa", but her present husband is Stach Japycz. Michałowa is honest, uncompromising and moody. She always says what she thinks. 

Zofia Stec "Babka" – A herbalist. She has supernatural abilities. Babka lives in a small cottage near the forest. She was Lucy's grandmother's friend and also helps Lucy.

Arkadiusz Czerepach - a high-ranking official in the administration of Mayor Kozioł. His official position is the town's secretary, and he is the second in command in Kozioł's office. He's much better educated than Kozioł, but in early seasons remains psychopathic towards the Mayor, while sometimes also working against him behind his back. Czerepach himself is also very cunning, ambitious, manipulative, and - especially in early seasons - ruthless and untrustworthy. At the end and season 1 Czerepach drunkenly brags to Mayor Kozioł about how he successfully manipulates both him, and his brother Priest Kozioł, after which the Mayor angrily chases him around the town with a hatchet. In season two Czerepach comes up with the idea of collecting documents containing "dirt" on everyone in town. The Mayor initially approves, but changes his mind when he discovers Czerepach started to collect incriminating information about him as well. As a result the Mayor arranges for Czerepach to take a course for officials in Brussels just to get rid of him. Czerepach gets back in season 3 with a large sum of money and intends to get his revenge on the Mayor. He is forced to leave Wilkowyje again, when a woman from Brussels arrives, revealing that he seduced her and stole her money while posing under the name of Paweł Kozioł. He gets back again in season 4, this time promising the Mayor help to get him reelected in the upcoming election. Hesitantly, Kozioł agrees, and hires Czerepach as the Deputy Mayor. During the election campaign Czerepach truly reveals himself to be a highly talented spin-doctor and political player, however Mayor still loses the election to Lucy, despite Czerepach's aggressive slander campaigning against her. To prove the Mayor his ability of manipulating people, Czerepach seduces Leokadia Paciorek, the Mayor's office chief accountant. They become a couple, but when Leokadia discovers that he used her she breaks up with him, only for Czerepach to realize that he's in love with her. She eventually forgives him and they get married off-screen between season 4 and 5. His new wife initially forbids him to get involved in politics and Czerepach gets a job outside it, but after some time he convinces Leokadia that his talents are wasted there and she allows him to work with Mayor again on his electoral campaign for the place in the Senate. Czerepach advises the new senator on his political moves, helping him to gain a huge popularity and found their own political party. In season 8 he becomes a member of parliament and a deputy prime minister of Poland. In the last season he runs Kozioł's electoral campaigning for presidency. 

Leokadia Czerepach – Chief accountant. Honest and frightened. She has fallen in love with Czerepach and they have married.

Kazimiera Solejukowa – She was a poor woman. Solejukowa lived with her alcoholic husband and their seven children in a cottage near the forest, but she became friends with Hadziukowa and Więcławska and then earned a lot of money. The Solejuk family built a new house. Solejukowa went on a university. She speaks English, German, Italian and French.

Maciej Solejuk – Solejukowa's husband.

Celina Hadziukowa – the owner of the herd of goats, Hadziuk's wife.

Tadeusz Hadziuk – Hadziukowa's husband.

Jolanta "Jola" Pietrek – Pietrek's wife. They have twin sons.

Patryk Pietrek – a singer, Jola's husband.

Stanisław "Stach" Japycz – Michałowa's husband.

Halina Kozioł – Paweł's wife. She knows about all of her husband's schemes.

Wiesława Oleś – The headmistress.

Krystyna Więcławska – The owner of the only shop in the village.

Mieczysław Wezół – The only doctor in Wilkowyje. He is afraid of his wife.

Dorota Wezół – The doctor's wife. She is elegant and spontaneous and is jealous of her husband.

Dorota "Dorotka" Sokołowska – She is Lucy and Kusy's little daughter.

Kinga – Grażyna's daughter. At the beginning Lucy and Kusy could not get along with her, but they later found a common language.

Tomasz Witebski – Polish teacher at the local school, the editor of the local press, radio and television and a writer. He fallen in love with Francesca and they have married.

Francesca – Italian police officer, came to Wilkowyje, within the framework of the EU Exchange. She stayed in Poland and married to Tomasz Witebski. They have a baby.

Violetta "Violetka"  – a barmaid, Stasiek's wife. They have got a daughter.

Stanisław Kotecki – a policeman, Violetka's husband.

Monika Korczab – Art agent, fascinated by Kusy's paintings.

Ola – Journalist and Czerepach's assistant.

Weronika Więcławska-Tao – daughter of Krystyna and Andrzej Więcławski.

Jerry Smith – employee of the American Embassy, in love with Lucy without reciprocity. Then he fell in love with Monika.

Jagna Nowak – a nurse.

Grażyna – Kinga's mother.

Wojciech Ostecki – a policeman.

Wacław Sądecki – a bishop.

Wargacz – Solejuk's neighbour.

Wargaczowa – Wargacz's wife.

Myćko – Wargacz's friend.

Weronka – a shop assistant.

Roman – an accountant.

Jakub – Kinga's boyfriend.

Ryszard Polakowski - village pharmacist.

Cast

Production

Location
Ranczo is set in the fictional small town of Wilkowyje, located near Radzyń Podlaski. The show is mainly filmed in Jeruzal, with scenes involving the exterior of one of the homes shot at a cottage located in Sokule.

Seasons
To date, the series has run for ten seasons. It was originally planned to end production in 2009, and the producers also tried to end the show in 2014, but due to its popularity, the programme kept being extended.

Production
Ranczo is produced by Studio A, part of ATM Grupa.

Reception
Ranczo was awarded the Telekamery Award for "Best Comedy Series" in 2009 and the Super Telekamery Award.

Episode list

Series overview

Season 1 (spring 2006)

Season 2 (spring 2007)

Season 3 (spring 2008)

Season 4 (spring 2009)

Season 5 (spring 2011) 
The first episode of the fifth season of the show will be aired March 6, 2011.

Season 6 (spring 2012)
The first episode of the sixth season of the show will be aired March 4, 2012.

Season 7 (spring 2013)

Season 8 (spring 2014)

Season 9 (spring 2015)

Season 10 (fall 2016)

Viewing figures

References

External links

Polish comedy-drama television series